Elections were held to the Church Assembly (Kyrkomötet), i.e. the "parliament" of the Church of Sweden on September 18, 2005. Simultaneously elections were held to diocese and parish assemblies all over the country.

The parties and church political outfits that take part in the elections are called 'nominating groups' (Nomineringsgrupper).

References

External links

Elections To The Church Assembly, 2005
Elections To The Church Assembly, 2005
Elections To The Church Assembly, 2005
Swedish Church Assembly elections
Elections To The Church Assembly, 2005
Swedish Church Assembly elections
Swedish Church Assembly elections
Swedish Church Assembly elections